Yitzhak Kanev (born Yitzhak Kanevsky, 1896 – 8 May 1980) was a Zionist activist and politician. He was the founder of the Kupat Holim health care system and directed it for 38 years.

Biography
Yitzhak (Isaac) Kanievsky was born in Melitopol in the Russian Empire (today in Ukraine). He studied Natural Sciences and Economics at university in Crimea, and later social sciences at the University of London, the University of Vienna, and the School of Economics & Law in Tel Aviv. In 1917, Kanievsky joined the Jewish Self Defense in Russia, and was one of the founders of the Russian branch of HeHalutz. He also served as a delegate to the Tzeiri Zion convention and the General Zionist Convention in St Petersburg.

In 1919, Kanev immigrated to Palestine. The following year he fought in the Battle of Tel Hai, where he was wounded. He later helped found Gdud HaAvoda and attended the convention that established the Histadrut trade union. In 1923, he became one of the leaders of the Histadrut's medical services, and in 1947 he established the Institute for Social Research, where he served as a director.

Given a place on the Mapai list for the 1949 Knesset elections, he missed out on a seat as the party won 46 seats. However, he entered the Knesset on 20 April 1950 as a replacement for the deceased Avraham Taviv. He lost his seat in the 1951 elections.

He died in 1980.

Awards and honours
In 1962 Kanev was awarded the Israel Prize in social sciences.

Works
Social policy and social insurance in Palestine (1942)
Social insurance in Palestine and its reconstruction (1946)
Society in Israel and social planning (1962)
Social policy in Israel: Achievements and shortcomings (1964)
Health, services in Israel and public expenditure on health and international comparisons (1965/66–1967/68) (1969)
Social and health research, 1964-1965 (1966)
Israel's war on poverty and new approaches to rehabilitation (1971)

See also
List of Israel Prize recipients

References

External links

1896 births
1980 deaths
Israeli Jews
Ukrainian Jews
Alumni of the University of London
University of Vienna alumni
Soviet emigrants to Mandatory Palestine
Jews in Mandatory Palestine
Israeli trade unionists
Israel Prize in social sciences recipients
People from Melitopol
Mapai politicians
Members of the 1st Knesset (1949–1951)